

Wolf Hagemann (20 July 1898 – 12 September 1983) was a German general during World War II. He was a recipient of the  Knight's Cross of the Iron Cross with Oak Leaves of Nazi Germany.

War crimes
On 2 September 1944 the 541th division of the Wehrmacht commanded by Hagemann executed altogether 448 Polish civilians, mainly women, elders and infants as young as 6 months old, during the pacification of Lipniak-Majorat village. The 541th division executed civilians in revenge for military activity of Polish Underground

Awards and decorations

 Knight's Cross of the Iron Cross with Oak Leaves
 Knight's Cross on 4 September 1940 as Oberstleutnant and commander of III./Gebirgsjäger-Regiment 139
 Oak Leaves on 4 June 1944 as Generalmajor and commander of 336. Infanterie-Division

References

Citations

Bibliography

 

1898 births
1983 deaths
Lieutenant generals of the German Army (Wehrmacht)
German Army personnel of World War I
Recipients of the clasp to the Iron Cross, 1st class
Recipients of the Knight's Cross of the Iron Cross with Oak Leaves
Military personnel from Saxony
People from Sächsische Schweiz-Osterzgebirge
German Army generals of World War II